Petre Marin (born 8 September 1973) is a retired Romanian footballer who played as a defender.

Club career
Marin made his professional debut in 1993, when he was signed by Sportul Studenţesc of Bucharest. In 1995, he joined FC Naţional București, where he remained until 2004. During the 2000–01 season, while under contract with Naţional București, he was loaned to Rapid București. In 2004, he was transferred to Steaua București and quickly earned himself a place in the first eleven. His six-year spell with Steaua include two Liga 1 titles, and a UEFA Cup semi-final in 2006. On 17 October 2008, Petre played his 400th match in Liga I.

On 8 June 2010, he signed a two-year deal with Unirea Urziceni making only four appearances because of the financial problems suffered by the club. As of August 2010, he made a total of 453 appearances in Liga I while playing for Urziceni. In February 2011, the 37-year-old defender signed for newly promoted team Concordia Chiajna. On 4 January 2012, he announced his retirement from professional football.

International career
Petre Marin won 9 caps for Romania and three caps for Romania under 21 team.

He made his senior national team debut on 27 May 2004 in a friendly match against Republic of Ireland.

Personal life
His son, Răzvan is also a professional footballer, currently playing for Italian side Cagliari.

Honours

References

External links
 Petre Marin  at SteauaFC.com 
 
 

1973 births
Living people
Footballers from Bucharest
Romanian footballers
Association football defenders
FC Sportul Studențesc București players
FC Progresul București players
FC Rapid București players
FC Steaua București players
FC Unirea Urziceni players
CS Concordia Chiajna players
Liga I players
Romania international footballers